The William H. Martin House is a historic house at 815 Quapaw Avenue in Hot Springs, Arkansas, USA. It was designed by the architect Frank W. Gibb in 1904 and built in the same year. It includes Colonial Revival and Classical Revival architectural elements. It is an imposing building with a two-story Greek temple portico supported by four fluted Corinthian style pillars. The portico's cornice is modillioned with scrolled brackets, and has a band of dentil molding. When built, the house was on the outskirts of Hot Springs.

The house was listed on the National Register of Historic Places in 1986.

See also
National Register of Historic Places listings in Garland County, Arkansas

References

Houses on the National Register of Historic Places in Arkansas
Colonial Revival architecture in Arkansas
Neoclassical architecture in Arkansas
Houses completed in 1904
Houses in Hot Springs, Arkansas
National Register of Historic Places in Hot Springs, Arkansas
Historic district contributing properties in Arkansas